Hermitude is an Australian electronic-hip hop duo, originating from the Blue Mountains, New South Wales.

Biography

Early years and Explanetary
Multi-instrumentalists, Luke Dubber (a.k.a. Luke Dubs) and Angus Stuart (a.k.a. El Gusto), have collaborated in bands since 1994, when they were aged 16 and 11, respectively. Their first functional band was called "Funk Injections" and included Stuart's sister, Aja Stuart, on bass.

When a group of local rappers, including Tim Levinson (a.k.a. Urthboy) from the Herd, were impressed by Funk Injections' abilities, the two groups briefly incorporated in 1998, performing for a while under the name "Explanetary". Explanetary consisted of Levinson on vocals, Dubber on keyboards, Stuart on drums, Realfatix on vocals (and sometimes production), No Mumbles (a.k.a. Nug) on vocals, Aja Stuart (Stuart's sister) on bass and DJ ALF on cuts. Explanetary only released one EP, In on the Deal, in July 2001 following which the members went their separate ways.

2000–2009: Career beginnings of Hermitude
After Stuart returned from a trip to the US in 2000 with a set of turntables, the two tried jamming together with Dubs playing keyboard, sans vocals. The combination worked so well that they realised they didn't need anything else, and Hermitude was formed.

Signing with the Elefant Traks label, founded by The Herd, Hermitude released the vinyl-only Imaginary Friends EP in 2002. The collection of esoteric instrumental soundscapes, with two vocal cuts provided by Urthboy and Ozi Batla, sold out and has never been transferred to CD, making it a collector's item. In 2003, the band released their first album, Alleys to Valleys. The name referred to their moving between Sydney and a recording studio called Sound Heaven in the Blue Mountains, owned by Stuart's father, John Stuart, which allowed them to live like hermit crabs half the time. The other half of their time they spent coming down from the mountains to try out their new material in the clubs of the city.

The popularity of Hermitude's debut allowed them to earn support billing with touring international acts such as, Dizzee Rascal, RJD2, and DJ Krush, and then record Tales of the Drift in 2005. A more percussive, Cuban sound was created, inspired by Stuart's time spent there in his youth. In 2006 Hermitude embarked overseas to pursue bigger success, landing gigs in Europe, Asia and the US. They were invited to perform in Malaysia, Norway and Spain as well as at DJ Kentaro's Japanese album launch, and were booked for Aceyalone and Abstract Rude's West Coast US tour. Whilst on this world tour, Dubber and Stuart wrote the tunes that would make up their 2007 EP, Rare Sightings. Released in November 2007, initially sold at venues on their return tour of Australia, it was their fourth release on Elefant Traks. Hermitude then joined Urthboy and The Tongue on a national tour throughout Australia. Copies of the CD sold out during the tour and had to go back to press before copies could be released in stores.

2010–2017: HyperParadise and Dark Night Sweet Light
In 2010, Hermitude released the single, "Get in My Life" and in 2011 "Speak of the Devil", from the album HyperParadise, which was released on 3 February 2012. The title track of the album peaked at number 38 on the ARIA Singles Chart in February 2013. "Speak of the Devil" won the 2011 J Award for Music Video of the Year.

In 2014 they released the single "Ukiyo" without radio or video servicing, yet in a few months it had millions of plays. In October of that year Hermitude toured North America for the first time, supporting Rüfüs Du Sol.

In January 2015, "Through the Roof", the first official single from the new album Dark Night Sweet Light. The album was released in May 2015 and peaked at number 1 on the ARIA Charts. The album spawned four other singles, including "The Buzz" featuring Mataya and Young Tapz which peaked at number 20, becoming Hermitude's highest-charting song.

In 2016, "Vibration"/"Gimme" was released, two tracks recorded for, but ultimately omitted from Dark Night Sweet Light.

2018–2020: Pollyanarchy
In November 2018, Hermitude released "Studid World" the first single from a forthcoming album. Hermitude said the song was written in response to the craziness happening globally, whether it be politically or societally, saying "However you wanna deal with what's happening around us in the world right now, you can do it your own way through music."

In September 2019, Hermitude released their sixth studio album, Pollyanarchy, which peaked at number 18 on the ARIA Charts.

2021–present: Mirror Mountain
In February 2022, the band announced the release of Mirror Mountain and released the single "Promises" featuring Andie.

Other projects
Apart from Hermitude, Stuart has spent the last couple of years playing and touring with Paul Mac as percussionist and DJ, whilst Dubber has lent his keyboard skills to many local Sydney outfits including Gauche, The Tango Saloon and The Bird, as well as touring with Tom Tom Crew the internationally acclaimed Hip-Hop Circus stage production.

Discography

Studio albums

Extended plays

Singles

Remixes
 Flume – "Holdin On" (2013)
 Sola Rosa featuring Serocee – "I've Tried Ways" (2013)
 Odesza featuring Zyra – "Say My Name" (2014)

Awards and nominations

AIR Awards
The Australian Independent Record Awards (commonly known informally as AIR Awards) is an annual awards night to recognise, promote and celebrate the success of Australia's Independent Music sector.

|-
| AIR Awards of 2009
|Threads 
| Best Independent Hip Hop/Urban Album
| 
|-
| AIR Awards of 2012
|HyperParadise
| Best Independent Dance/Electronica album
| 
|-
| rowspan="4" | AIR Awards of 2015
| themselves
| Best Independent Artist
| 
|-
| rowspan="2" | Dark Night Sweet Light
| Best Independent Album
| 
|-
|Best Independent Dance/Electronic Album
| 
|-
|Hermitude featuring Mataya & Young Tapz – "The Buzz"
| Best Independent Single or EP
| 
|-
| AIR Awards of 2019
| "Stupid World" (featuring Bibi Bourelly)
| Best Independent Single or EP
| 
|-
| AIR Awards of 2020
| Pollyanarchy
| Best Independent Dance or Electronica Album or EP
| 
|-

Australia Music Prize
The Australian Music Prize (the AMP) is an annual award of $30,000 given to an Australian band or solo artist in recognition of the merit of an album released during the year of award.

|-
| 2012
|HyperParadise
| Australian Album of the Year
| 
|-

ARIA Music Awards
The ARIA Music Awards is an annual awards ceremony that recognises excellence, innovation, and achievement across all genres of Australian music.

|-
| rowspan="2" | 2012
| HyperParadise
| Best Dance Release
| 
|-
| "Speak of the Devil" (directed by Emma Tomelty)
| Best Video
| 
|-
| rowspan="7" | 2015
| rowspan="3" | Dark Night Sweet Light
| Album of the Year
| 
|-
| Best Group
| 
|-
| Best Independent Release
| 
|-
| Mitch Kenny for Dark Night Sweet Light
| Engineer of the Year
| 
|-
| Luke Dubber and Angus Stuart for Dark Night Sweet Light
| Producer of the Year
| 
|-
| Through the Roof" (directed by Kess Broekman-Dattner)
| Best Video
| 
|-
| Dark Night Sweet Light Tour
| Best Australian Live Act
| 
|-

J Awards
The J Awards are an annual series of Australian music awards that were established by the Australian Broadcasting Corporation's youth-focused radio station Triple J. They commenced in 2005.

|-
| J Awards of 2011
| "Speak of the Devil" (directed by Emma Tomelty)
| Australian Video of the Year
| 
|-
| J Awards of 2015
| Dark Night Sweet Light
| Australian Album of the Year
|

National Live Music Awards
The National Live Music Awards (NLMAs) are a broad recognition of Australia's diverse live industry, celebrating the success of the Australian live scene. The awards commenced in 2016.

|-
| National Live Music Awards of 2019
| Hermitude
| Live Electronic Act (or DJ) of the Year
| 
|-

References

External links
 
 

2000 establishments in Australia
Australian hip hop groups
New South Wales musical groups
Musical groups established in 2000